Two-stage presidential elections were held in Finland in 1978, the first since 1968 after Urho Kekkonen's term was extended by four years by Parliament. The public elected presidential electors to an electoral college on 15 and 16 January. They in turn elected the President. The result was a victory for Urho Kekkonen, who won on the first ballot. The turnout for the popular vote was 64.3.  Kekkonen had in the spring of 1975 agreed to become the Social Democratic presidential candidate, and after that all the major Finnish political parties chose him as their candidate.  Kekkonen's opponents, such as the Christian League's presidential candidate Raino Westerholm, claimed that Kekkonen's long presidency weakened the Finnish democracy.  Over one-third of the Finnish voters abstained from voting, partly as a protest against Kekkonen's expected landslide victory.

The 77-year-old President Kekkonen's health was already declining, although this fact was not easily noticeable in his public appearances.

Results

Popular vote

Electoral college

References

1978
Finland
January 1978 events in Europe